Little Red Schoolhouse may refer to:

 Little Red Schoolhouse (Beyerville, Arizona), a historic one-room school built in 1921
 Little Red Schoolhouse (Kingman, Arizona), listed on the National Register of Historic Places (NRHP)
 Little Red Schoolhouse (Scottsdale, Arizona), now used as the Scottsdale Historical Museum, NRHP-listed
 Little Red Schoolhouse (Cedar Falls, Iowa), part of the Cedar Falls Historical Society
 Little Red Schoolhouse (West Farmington, Maine), NRHP-listed
 Little Red Schoolhouse (Amherst, Massachusetts), preschool designed by McKim, Mead and White
 Little Red Schoolhouse (Milton Mills, New Hampshire), listed on the New Hampshire State Register of Historic Places
 Little Red Schoolhouse (Florham Park, New Jersey), NRHP-listed
 Little Red Schoolhouse (Brunswick, New York), NRHP-listed as District No. 6 Schoolhouse
 Little Red Schoolhouse (Shaw Island, Washington), NRHP-listed, in San Juan County
 Little Red Schoolhouse (Clymer Center, New York), listed on both the New York State Register of Historic Places, and listed on the National Register of Historic Places as Clymer District School No.5]]

See also
 The Little Red Schoolhouse, 1936 American drama film directed by Charles Lamont
 The Little Red Schoolhouse (1923 film), an American silent film directed by John Adolfi
 Little Red School House, New York City progressive school
 Little Red (Saranac Lake, New York), a historic cure cottage, NRHP-listed
 Little Red School House 1835 District No. 7, Newport, New Hampshire 
 Eureka Masonic College, Richland, Mississippi, also known as the "Little Red Schoolhouse", birthplace of the Order of the Eastern Star
 Garcia School, Wickenburg, Arizona, also known as the "Little Red Schoolhouse" or the "Garcia Little Red Schoolhouse"
 Old District 10 Schoolhouse, Middleburg Heights, Ohio, also known as the "Little Red Schoolhouse", NRHP-listed
 Newberry Historic District (Newberry, Florida), containing Little Red Schoolhouse